"The Farnsworth Parabox" is the fifteenth episode in the fourth season of the American animated television series Futurama. It first aired on the Fox network in the United States on June 8, 2003. The episode was written by Bill Odenkirk and directed by Ron Hughart. The plot of this episode revolves around the Planet Express crew's adventures in parallel universes.

Plot
After an experiment nearly kills him, Professor Farnsworth plans to destroy a yellow box containing said experiment by ejecting it into the sun. He forbids the Planet Express staff to open it, and Hermes assigns Leela to guard it, after she makes excuses not to go out on a date with Fry. While she keeps the others from looking in, she finds herself tempted and flips a coin to decide whether or not to look inside; after getting a positive answer, she falls into the box and finds herself in a parallel universe with other versions of the Planet Express crew.

The parallel Leela orders everyone in the original universe to come into their universe, as the parallel Professor believes that the original universe members are all evil. The two Farnsworths discover that, just as the original Farnsworth accidentally invented a box containing a parallel universe, the parallel universe Farnsworth accidentally invented a box containing the original universe. They also discover the major difference between the two realities: namely, coin flips have opposite outcomes, which explains why the parallel Leela did not open the box that she was guarding. Fry and Leela are also surprised to discover that their doppelgangers are happily married, because at one point the two Leelas each flipped a coin to decide whether or not accept a date from Fry.

The Professors eventually decide that nobody is evil and the members of both universes spend time befriending one another. However, just before the original Planet Express crew returns home, parallel Hermes comes in to destroy the box containing the original universe. The crew realize that this means the original-universe Hermes must be doing the same thing to the box containing the parallel universe (i.e., the universe that they are all in). They plan to go back through the box to stop Hermes but discover that the box is missing, having been stolen by the two Zoidbergs. The two Farnsworths try to recreate the original box, but end up creating a large number of boxes containing different universes. The Zoidbergs flee into the boxes, leading to a chase across multiple odd dimensions. They are eventually caught, however, and everyone jumps into the box containing the original universe just in time to save it from Hermes.

The two crews say goodbye before returning to their respective universes. To ensure the safety of both, the Farnsworths exchange their universe-boxes by pulling each through the other, meaning that each now paradoxically has a box containing their own universe. Meanwhile, Fry asks Leela on a date again; she flips a coin, then decides to accept without looking at it.

Broadcast and reception
In 2006, this episode was ranked 17th on IGN's list of the top 25 episodes of Futurama. The episode was noted for its humor as a standalone episode and in particular for Universe #420 where Professor Farnsworth tells his hippie counterpart to get a job. The 2013 revision of the list bumped the episode up to number 16, reassessing it as better than "The Devil's Hands Are Idle Playthings", "Space Pilot 3000", the two "Anthology of Interest" episodes, "Parasites Lost", "Fry and the Slurm Factory", and "Love's Labors Lost in Space", all of which had previously been ranked higher. The reassessment praised the episode's study of alternate Futurama realities. In 2013, it was ranked number 6 "as voted on by fans" for Comedy Central's Futurama Fanarama marathon.

References

External links

 The Farnsworth Parabox at The Infosphere.
 

Futurama (season 4) episodes
2003 American television episodes
Television episodes about parallel universes